Mill Hill railway station may refer to:

Railway stations currently in use 
 Mill Hill railway station (Lancashire) in Lancashire
 Mill Hill Broadway railway station in London
 Mill Hill East tube station in London

Disused or demolished railway stations 
 Mill Hill railway station (Isle of Wight) in Cowes
 Mill Hill (The Hale) railway station in London

Similar names 
You may be looking for
 Mills Hill railway station in Manchester